Mick "Michael" Connell (born 13 November 1961) is an Australian wheelchair tennis player.  He won a silver medal in the Men's Singles event at the 1988 Seoul Paralympics. He participated without winning any medals at the 1992 Barcelona Paralympics. In 1996, he won the men's doubles at the Australian Open with his partner, David Hall. At the 1996 Atlanta Paralympics, he won a silver medal in the Men's Doubles event with Hall.

Connell won three Australian Opens - 1989, 1991 and 1993). His other tournament victories included three Japan Opens (1986, 1987, 1989), two Swiss Opens (1988, 1992), three Austrian Opens (1988, 1991, 1993), two German Opens (1988, 1990), the 1988 French Open and the 1994 Belgian Open. In 1994, Connell and Hall won the World Team Cup, Australia's first win at this prestigious tournament.

Connell runs the "Wheelies" Wheelchair Tennis program and coaches Adam Kellerman. In 2014, Connell was still competing in major tournaments in Australia.

References

External links
 
 
 

1961 births
Living people
Australian male tennis players
Australian wheelchair tennis players
Paralympic wheelchair tennis players of Australia
Paralympic silver medalists for Australia
Paralympic medalists in wheelchair tennis
Medalists at the 1988 Summer Paralympics
Medalists at the 1996 Summer Paralympics
Wheelchair tennis players at the 1988 Summer Paralympics
Wheelchair tennis players at the 1992 Summer Paralympics
Wheelchair tennis players at the 1996 Summer Paralympics
Tennis players from Sydney
20th-century Australian people
21st-century Australian people